is a Japanese voice actress and J-pop idol singer who voiced the title character (Miho Shinohara A.K.A. Fancy Lala) in Fancy Lala and also sang the opening and ending themes.

External links
 Reiko Omori at Hitoshi Doi's seiyuu database

1984 births
Japanese television personalities
Japanese voice actresses
Living people
Voice actors from Hakodate
Voice actresses from Hokkaido
21st-century Japanese singers